Kozhanov is a Russian surname that may refer to:

 Denys Kozhanov (born 1987), Ukrainian footballer
 Oleg Kozhanov (born 1987), Russian footballer
 Sergei Kozhanov (born 1964), Soviet and Russian footballer
 Yuriy Kozhanov (born 1990), Kazakh basketball player

See also
 

Russian-language surnames
Ukrainian-language surnames